The 2015 NCAA Division I men's ice hockey tournament was the national championship tournament for men's college ice hockey in the United States in 2015. The tournament involved 16 teams in single-elimination play to determine the national champion at the Division I level of the NCAA, the highest level of competition in college hockey. The tournament's Frozen Four – the semifinals and final – were hosted by Hockey East at the TD Garden in Boston, Massachusetts.

Providence defeated Boston University 4–3 to win the program's first NCAA title.

The championship game is remembered for a gaffe goal that allowed Providence to tie the score with less than 10 minutes to play.

Tournament procedure

The tournament will consist of four groups of four teams in regional brackets.  The four regionals are officially named after their geographic areas.  The following are the sites for the 2015 regionals:
March 27 and 28
West Regional, Scheels Arena – Fargo, North Dakota (Host: University of North Dakota)
Northeast Regional, Verizon Wireless Arena – Manchester, New Hampshire (Host: University of New Hampshire)

March 28 and 29
East Regional, Dunkin' Donuts Center – Providence, Rhode Island (Host: Brown University)
Midwest Regional, Compton Family Ice Arena – South Bend, Indiana (Host: University of Notre Dame)

The winner of each regional will advance to the Frozen Four:

April 9–11
TD Garden – Boston, Massachusetts (Host: Hockey East)

Qualifying teams
The at-large bids and seeding for each team in the tournament were announced on March 22. The NCHC had six teams receive a berth in the tournament, ECAC Hockey and Hockey East each had three teams receive a berth, the Western Collegiate Hockey Association (WCHA) had two teams receive a berth, and one team from both the Big Ten Conference and Atlantic Hockey received a berth.

Number in parentheses denotes overall seed in the tournament.

Tournament bracket

Note: * denotes overtime period(s)

Results

Midwest Region – South Bend

Regional semifinal

Regional Final

West Region – Fargo

Regional semifinal

Regional Final

Northeast Region – Manchester

Regional semifinal

Regional Final

East Region – Providence

Regional semifinal

Regional Final

Frozen Four – Boston

Semifinal

National Championship – Boston

Record by conference

Media

Television
ESPN has US television rights to all games during the tournament for the eleventh consecutive year. ESPN will air every game, beginning with the regionals, on ESPN, ESPN2, ESPNU, or ESPN3 and will stream them online via WatchESPN. 
The Sports Network holds Canadian TV rights to all games. The games are across the network on all five feeds—TSN1, TSN2, TSN3, TSN4, and TSN5. Although they are broadcast under the TSN banner, it is actually a
simulcast of the ESPN feed with the ESPN announcers.

Broadcast Assignments
Regionals
West Regional: Clay Matvick & Sean Ritchlin – Fargo, North Dakota
Northeast Regional: Dan Parkhurst & Billy Jaffe – Manchester, New Hampshire
East Regional: John Buccigross, Barry Melrose & Quint Kessenich – Providence, Rhode Island
Midwest Regional: Ben Holden & Blake Geoffrion – South Bend, Indiana

Frozen Four & Championship
John Buccigross, Barry Melrose, & Quint Kessenich – Boston, Massachusetts

Radio
Westwood One has exclusive radio rights to the Frozen Four and will air both the semifinals and the championship.
Sean Grande, Cap Raeder, & Adam Wodon

All-Tournament team

Frozen Four
G: Jon Gillies* (Providence)
D: Anthony Florentino (Providence)
D: Matt Grzelcyk (Boston University)
F: Ahti Oskanen (Boston University)
F: Mark Jankowski (Providence)
F: Jack Eichel (Boston University)
* Most Outstanding Player(s)

References

Tournament
NCAA Division I men's ice hockey tournament
NCAA Division I men's ice hockey tournament
NCAA Division I men's ice hockey tournament
NCAA Division I men's ice hockey tournament
NCAA Division I men's ice hockey tournament
NCAA Division I men's ice hockey tournament
NCAA Division I men's ice hockey tournament
NCAA Division I men's ice hockey tournament
NCAA Division I men's ice hockey tournament
History of Providence, Rhode Island
History of South Bend, Indiana
Ice hockey competitions in Boston
Ice hockey competitions in Indiana
Ice hockey competitions in New Hampshire
Ice hockey competitions in North Dakota
Ice hockey competitions in Rhode Island
Sports in Fargo, North Dakota
Sports in Manchester, New Hampshire
Sports in Providence, Rhode Island
Sports in South Bend, Indiana